Debasis Dash is an Indian computational biologist and a senior principal scientist at the Institute of Genomics and Integrative Biology (IGIB). Known for his research on Ayurgenomics and  extra-pulmonary tuberculosis, his studies have been documented by way of a number of articles and ResearchGate, an online repository of scientific articles has listed 133 of them. The Department of Biotechnology of the Government of India awarded him the National Bioscience Award for Career Development, one of the highest Indian science awards, for his contributions to biosciences, in 2014.

Selected bibliography

References 

N-BIOS Prize recipients
Indian scientific authors
Living people
Indian biologists
Scientists from Delhi
Year of birth missing (living people)